Live Oak Bank, a subsidiary of Live Oak Bancshares, Inc., is an American bank. Headquartered in Wilmington, NC, it serves small business owners in all 50 states and was the leading SBA and USDA lender by dollar volume in 2020.

History
Founded in 2008 by James S. (Chip) Mahan III, Live Oak initially focused on lending to niche industries such as veterinarians and dentists. Today, the bank lends to more than 30 specialized industries in all 50 states and has more than a dozen general lenders in markets across the country that directly serve small business owners. The bank specializes in SBA and USDA loans and offers business and personal deposit products on its branchless, digital platform.

Live Oak timeline

 2008 - Live Oak Bank founded
 2011 – nCino created by Live Oak’s founders
 2012 - $1.2 billion originated
 2013 – Live Oak Ventures formed 
 2014 – nCino spun out to shareholders
 2014-17 – Live Oak was awarded “Best Bank to Work For” by American Banker
 2015 – Live Oak Bank files for its initial public offering (Nasdaq: LOB). 
 2015 – Launch of Digital Bank
 2017-2020 – Named the number one SBA 7(a) lender in the country
 2017 –  Apiture was founded in a joint venture with First Data and is part of Live Oak’s fintech ecosystem.
 2018 – Business model shifts to holding loans
 2019 – Live Oak is named the highest dollar volume USDA lender in the country
 2019 - $10.95 billion originated
 2020 – Canapi Venture launches $545 million fintech investment fund
 2020 – Live Oak Bank goes live on Finxact core

Subsidiaries

 Apiture, an open API banking platform founded in 2017 as a joint venture between First Data Corporation and Live Oak Bank, is on a mission to reimagine the digital banking experience. With offices in Wilmington, N.C. and Austin, Texas, the company was named one of the Best Fintechs to Work For by American Banker in 2021.
 Live Oak Private Wealth, an SEC‐registered investment advisory firm, launched in 2018 under Live Oak Bancshares and is based in Wilmington, N.C. Live Oak Private Wealth offers a full spectrum of financial services including investment and wealth advisory services, wealth analytics and solutions, portfolio development, business, estate, retirement and financial planning, technical insights and cash management. Live Oak Private Wealth acquired Jolly Asset Management in 2020.
 Canapi Ventures is a venture capital firm investing in early to growth‐stage fintech companies. It launched its $650 million fintech fund in 2020 to support innovation in financial services. Canapi Ventures is advised by Canapi Advisors, LLC, a wholly owned subsidiary of Live Oak Bancshares, Inc. and CenterHarbor Advisors, an indirect subsidiary of CenterHarbor Holding Company, owned and controlled by Gene Ludwig, former Comptroller of the Currency and the Co‐Founder of Promontory Interfinancial Network. Ludwig and Chip Mahan, Live Oak Bancshares Chairman and CEO, are co-managing partners. The team includes several other financial services and venture capital veterans including Live Oak Bancshares President Neil Underwood, and partners Walker Forehand, Dan Beldy and Jeff Reitman, as well as Senior Advisors Jeffrey Goldstein and Jim Hale. Canapi has offices in Wilmington, N.C., Washington, D.C. and New York City.

References

Banks based in North Carolina
Companies based in Wilmington, North Carolina
2008 establishments in North Carolina
Companies listed on the Nasdaq
Banks established in 2008
2015 initial public offerings